Philips Wouwerman (also Wouwermans) (24 May 1619 (baptized) – 19 May 1668) was a Dutch painter of hunting, landscape and battle scenes.

Life and work
Philips Wouwerman was one of the most versatile and prolific artists of the Dutch Golden Age. Embedded in the artistic environment and tradition of his home town of Haarlem, Wouwerman made an important and highly influential contribution to the canon of seventeenth-century Dutch painting. His pictures were in demand during his lifetime, and even more sought after in the 18th century. Throughout Europe, formerly princely art collections like in Dresden and St. Petersburg still bear witness to this widespread admiration of Wouwerman's art.

Born in Haarlem in 1619, the son of a now altogether obscure painter named Pouwels Joostsz Wouwerman, little is known of his artistic schooling. According to Cornelis de Bie, he studied with Frans Hals (1581/85–1666), but the particular style of Hals didn't leave a footmark on his oeuvre. Apart from a short stay in Hamburg at the end of the 1630s, Wouwerman seemed to have lived in Haarlem during his whole artistic career and died as a prosperous member of the community at the age of 48. He joined the Haarlem Guild of St. Luke in 1640 and here took on several official posts in the years to come.  Wouwerman also worked as an estate agent in his home town, as many documents in Haarlem archives mentioned the artist in this context.

Wouwerman started his artistic career with simple depictions of everyday life in the tradition of the bamboccianti by Pieter van Laer (1592/99–after 1642). His paintings of the mid-1640s often feature a diagonal slope of land, a tree which functions as a repoussoir, and figures accompanied by horses. Over the next thirty years he developed an individual style, treating a wide range of subjects from genre and landscape to military and religious scenes (equestrian scenes, hunting and hawking parties, landscapes with travellers, cavalry battles and military encampments, peasants festivities etc.). He is noted for his skill in the depiction of horses of all breeds seen in motion. The art historian Frederik J. Duparc calls Wouwerman "undoubtedly the most accomplished and successful 17th-century Dutch painter of horses". The masterpieces from his best period (around 1650–1660) are of indisputably high quality, beautifully combining imaginary southern landscapes and a typically Dutch atmosphere. Wouwerman's paintings are characterized by subdued colours, a cool atmosphere and a wealth of witty, anecdotal details.  He died in Haarlem.

The first retrospective exhibition of Philips Wouwerman's work took place in Kassel, Gemäldegalerie Alte Meister, and in The Hague, The Royal Picture Gallers Mauritshuis, 2009/2010.

Family
At an early age, Wouwerman married Anna Pietersz. van Broeckhoff with whom he had ten children. They lived on the Bakenessergracht in a house that was also lived in by Haarlem  painters Cornelis Gerritsz Decker and Hendrik de Meijer. Seven of the Wouwerman children survived and, after the death of their mother in 1670, accepted a substantial inheritance.

Output
About 800 pictures were listed in John Smith's Catalogue raisonné (1829/1842) as the work of Philip Wouwerman. In Hofstede de Groot's enlarged Catalogue (1908) the number exceeds to 1200. In Birgit Schumacher's recently published Catalogue raisonné (2006), only about 570 pictures were listed as authentic works, as many of the pictures mentioned by Hofstede de Groot were actually painted by countless followers and imitators all over Europe. Jan and Pieter Wouwerman, the younger brothers of Philips, were often regarded as close followers whose pictures seemed to have been frequently attributed to Philips. 

The oeuvre of Pieter (1623–1682) clearly manifests the influence of Philips with regard to the range of subjects, but regarding the artistic style, Pieter had quite one of his own. And Jan (1629–1666) was a rather autonomous landscape painter. Out of the countless followers, some of the most gifted artists working in Wouwerman's style are worth mentioning: Jan van Huchtenburgh (1647–1733), the brothers Jan Frans (1683–1750) and Joseph van Bredael (1688–1739) as well as Carel van Falens (1683–1733).

His registered pupils were Johannes van der Bent, Hendrick Berckman, Eduard Dubois, Nicolas Ficke, Barent Gael, Anthony de Haen, Emanuel Murant, Matthias Scheits, Kort Withold, and his brothers.

Selected works
 The White Horse, panel, 43.9 x 37.6 cm, Amsterdam, Rijksmuseum
 Horse and Dismounted Rider, panel, 32.3 x 36.2 cm, 1646, Leipzig, Museum der bildenden Künste
 Landscape with River and Bathers, canvas, 59 x 82 cm, Vaduz-Vienna, The Collections of the Prince of Liechtenstein
 Festive Peasants in an Extensive Landscape, canvas, 70 x 112 cm, 1653, Minneapolis, The Minneapolis Institute of Arts
 Winter Landscape with Wooden Bridge, panel, 28.5 x 36.5 cm, Berlin, Staatliche Museen, Gemäldegalerie
 A Horse Stable, canvas, 47 x 67 cm, London, The National Gallery
 The Rider's Halting Place, panel, 35.4 x 30.7 cm, Antwerp, Royal Museum of Fine Arts
 The Apple Grey at a Blacksmith, panel, 34.4. x 38.3 cm, Kassel, Gemäldegalerie Alte Meister
 Riding School and Watering Place, canvas, 82.5 x 127 cm, Vienna, Kunsthistorisches Museum
 Departure for the Hunt, panel, 45 x 64 cm, Dresden, Gemäldegalerie Alte Meister
 Landscape with a Hawking Party, canvas, 76 x 105 cm, Madrid, Museo Nacional del Prado
 Battle at a Mountainous Fortress, canvas, 69 x 82 cm, Dresden, Gemäldegalerie Alte Meister
 Cavalry at a Sutler's Booth, panel, 49.5 x 44.4 cm, London, Her Majesty Queen Elizabeth II., Buckingham Palace
 Lady and Gentleman at a Harbour, canvas, 51 x 71.3 cm, St Petersburg, The State Hermitage
 The Ascension of Christ, canvas, 85 x 68 cm, Brunswick, Herzog Anton Ulrich-Museum

References

Attribution

Further reading
 Philips Wouwerman (1619-1668). Exhibition Catalogue, Museumslandschaft Hessen Kassel/ Royal Picture Gallery Mauritshuis, The Hague, 2009/2010, 
 Birgit Schumacher, Philips Wouwerman. The Horse Painter of the Golden Age, Davaco Publishers, Doornspijk 2006, 
 Frederik J. Duparc, "Philips Wouwerman, 1619-1668", in: Oud Holland, 1993, vol. 107, no. 3, pp. 257–286
 Birgit Schumacher, Studien zu Werk und Wirkung Philips Wouwermans''', Diss. Munich 1989
 Cornelis Hofstede de Groot, Beschreibendes und kritisches Verzeichnis der Werke der hervorragendsten holländischen Maler des XVII. Jahrhunderts, vol. 2, Esslingen and Paris 1908 (Reprint: Teaneck, NJ: Somerset House, 1976; A Catalogue Raisonné of the Works of the Most Eminent Dutch Painters of the Seventeenth Century, vol. 2)
 John Smith, A Catalogue Raisonné of the Works of the Most Eminent Dutch, Flemish and French Painters'', vol. 1, pp. 199–412 and vol. 9, pp. 137–233, London 1829 and 1842

External links

www.wouwerman.org Works by Philips Wouwerman
www.birgitschumacher.com Information on the catalogue raisonné of the paintings by Philips Wouwerman
Works and literature

Dutch Golden Age painters
Dutch male painters
Dutch war artists
1619 births
1668 deaths
Artists from Haarlem
Painters from Haarlem